Rauf Klasra is a Pakistani journalist and renowned legend of LayyahUrdu language columnist. He files stories for both the news paper and television. Moreover he is also running a web paper and was earlier working with The News. Klasra is known for investigating political scams and scandals and has unfolded many financial and moral scams of political elite.

Background and early life 
Rauf Klasra belongs to Layyah District of Punjab, Pakistan. The word Klasra comes from his village of Jaysal Klasra.
He is graduated from Bahauddin Zakariya University, Multan and Goldsmiths, University of London. He has done graduation in English Literature. Klasra has made headlines in the past for tweeting some unverified news

Career 
Klasra is a leading columnist of Urdu language and has authored four books. He started his career as a reporter for Daily Dawn and was later moved to Islamabad office of Dawn. 
He left Dawn to move to The News and started writing columns for Jang and Akhbar-e-Jahan as well. Later he moved to The Express Tribune as Editor Investigations.

Klasra has worked in Dunya Television as Editor Investigations where he was heading the Investigations department. He frequently appears on all local television channels as a political analyst and is famous for talking a bold, unique and unpopular stance on complex issues.

He has also worked as the co-anchor of a news show on 92 News called "Muqabil"  where he frequently gave out political scams and financial scandals. He quit the show and resigned from 92 News on 28 April 2019 and joined Public News where he hosts the show "Muqabil Public Kay Sath". Klasra has won the APNS best reporter of the year award multiple times.`

Books 
 Ek Syasat Kaee Kahanian
 " Ek qatal jo ho na saka"
 Urdu translation of Novel " Godfather "

References

External links 
 Rauf Klasra's official site
 Top Story Online Rauf Klasra's web-paper
 Facebook Page

 Rauf Klasra Columns

Living people
Pakistani male journalists
Pakistani columnists
Pakistani investigative journalists
Bahauddin Zakariya University alumni
Year of birth missing (living people)